The Illyrian Kingdom is the name of a country that existed on the Western part of the Balkan Peninsula in ancient times and represented an alliance of Illyrian tribes.

History 

In southern Illyria organized realms were formed earlier than in other areas of this region. One of the oldest known Illyrian dynasty is that of the Enchelei, which seems to have reached its height from the 8th–7th centuries BC, but the dynasty fell from dominant power around the 6th century BC. It seems that the weakening of the dynasty of Enchelae resulted in their assimilation and inclusion into a newly established Illyrian realm at the latest in the 5th century BC, marking the arising of the Dassaretii, who appear to have replaced the Enchelei in the Lakeland area of Lychnidus. 

The weakening of the Enchelean realm was also caused by the strengthening of another Illyrian dynasty established in its vicinity—that of the Taulantii—which existed for some time along with that of the Enchelei. The Taulantii—another people among the more anciently known groups of Illyrian tribes—lived on the Adriatic coast of southern Illyria (modern Albania), dominating at various times much of the plain between the Drin and the Aous, comprising the area around Epidamnus/Dyrrhachium. When describing the Illyrian invasion of Macedonia ruled by Argaeus I, somewhere between 678–640 BC, the historian Polyaenus ( 2nd-century AD) recorded the supposed oldest known king in Illyria, Galaurus or Galabrus, a ruler of the Taulantii who reigned in the latter part of the 7th century BC.    Some scholars consider the authenticity of Polyaenus' passage as disputable. Whether or not this account is historically reliable, and despite Polyaenus' interest in the anecdote, it implies the widespread thought throughout antiquity about a significant animosity between the Macedonians and the Illyrians as early as the 7th century BC, if the consensus in modern scholarship in dating the reigning period of Argaeus I is correct.  In the 7th century BC the Taulantii invoked the aid of Corcyra and Corinth in a war against the Liburni. After the defeat and expulsion from the region of the Liburni, the Corcyreans founded in 627 BC on the Illyrian mainland a colony called Epidamnus, thought to have been the name of an Illyrian (barbarian) king of the region. A flourishing commercial centre emerged and the city grew rapidly. The Taulantii continued to play an important role in Illyrian history between the 5th and 4th–3rd centuries BC, and in particular, in the history of Epidamnus, both as its neighbours and as part of its population. Notably, they influenced the affairs in the internal conflicts between aristocrats and democrats. The Taulantian dynasty seems to have reached its climax during Glaukias' rule, in the years between 335 BC and 302 BC.  

According to some modern scholars the dynasty of Bardylis—the first attested dardanian dynasty—in fact, was Dassaretan.   There is also another historical reconstruction that considers Bardylis a Dardani a ruler, who during the expansion of his dominion included the region of Dassaretis in his realm, but this interpretation has been challenged by historians who consider Dardania too far north for the events involving the Illyrian king Bardylis and his dynasty.  

After Philip II of Macedon defeated Bardylis (358 BC), the Grabaei under Grabos II became the strongest state in Illyria. Philip II killed 7,000 Illyrians in a great victory and annexed the territory up to Lake Ohrid. Next, Philip II reduced the Grabaei, and then went for the Ardiaei, defeated the Triballi (339 BC), and fought with Pleurias (337 BC). After that Alexander the Great  had defeated Illyrian chieftain Clitus forces in 335 B.C. and Illyrian soldiers and tribal leaders participated in his conquest of Persia. After the death of Alexander, Illyrian tribes started to rise to become independent from Macedonian rule. Following that in 312 B.C king Glaucius expelled Greeks from Durres.

During the second part of the 3rd century BC, a number of Illyrian tribes seem to have united to form a proto-state stretching from the central part of present-day Albania up to Neretva river in Herzegovina. The political entity was financed on piracy and ruled from 250 BC by the king Agron. He was succeeded by his wife Teuta, who assumed the regency for her stepson Pinnes following Agron's death in 231 BC. Queen Teuta was famous for having waged wars against the Romans. 

At the Neretva Delta, there was a strong Hellenistic influence on the Illyrian tribe of Daors. Their capital was Daorson located in Ošanići near Stolac in Herzegovina, which became the main center of classical Illyrian culture. Daorson, during the 4th century BC, was surrounded by megalithic, 5 meter high stonewalls, composed out of large trapeze stones blocks. Daors also made unique bronze coins and sculptures. The Illyrians even conquered Greek colonies on the Dalmatian islands. 

The Illyrian kingdom was composed of small areas within the region of Illyria. Only the Romans ruled the entire region. The internal organization of the south Illyrian kingdom points to imitation of their neighbouring Greek kingdoms and influence from the Greek and Hellenistic world in the growth of their urban centres. Polybius gives as an image of society within an Illyrian kingdom as peasant infantry fought under aristocrats which he calls in Greek Polydynastae (Greek: Πολυδυνάστες) where each one controlled a town within the kingdom. The monarchy was established on hereditary lines and Illyrian rulers used marriages as a means of alliance with other powers. Pliny (23–79 AD) writes that the people that formed the nucleus of the Illyrian kingdom were 'Illyrians proper' or Illyrii Proprie Dicti. They were the Taulantii, the Pleraei, the Endirudini, Sasaei, Grabaei and the Labeatae. These later joined to form the Docleatae. 

The last known king of illyrians was 
King Ballaios who ruled over the city of Rhizon and surrounding areas after Roman occupation, from 167 BC until 135 BC.

Rulers

Enchelean-Taulantian rulers

 Galaurus: king of Taulantii. Unsuccessfully invaded Macedonia between 678–640 BC.
 Grabos I (5th century BC): attested on an Athenian inscription, he was very likely a person with great political responsibilities. He probably was the grandfather of Grabos II.
 Sirras (437–390 BC), ruler in Lyncestis.
 Grabos II (r. 358–356 BC): entered Athenian alliance to resist Philip's power in 356 BC.
 Pleuratus I (r. 356–335 BC): reigned near the Adriatic coast in southern Illyria. In a losing effort in 344 BC, tried to thwart Philip's advances in Illyria.
 Pleurias (r. c. 337/336 BC): Illyrian ruler who campaigned against Philip II about 337 BC. He is considered by some scholars as king of either the Autariatae, the Taulantii, or the Dardani. Some have suggested that he was the same as Pleuratus I; Pleurias is mentioned only in Diodorus (16.93.6), elsewhere unattested  in ancient sources.
 Cleitus, son of Bardylis I (r. 335–295 BC): mastermind behind the Illyrian Revolt in Pelion of 335 BC against Alexander the Great.
 Glaucias: king of Taulantii. He aided Cleitus at the Battle of Pelion in 335 BC, raised Pyrrhus of Epirus and was involved in other events in southern Illyria in the late 4th century BC.
 Monunius I, (r. 290–270 BC): reigned during the Gallic invasions of 279 BC. He minted his own silver staters in Dyrrhachion.
 Mytilos, successor of Monunius I and probably his son (r. 270–?): waged war on Epirus in 270 BC. He minted his own bronze coins in Dyrrhachion.

Ardiaean-Labeatan rulers

 Pleuratus II: reigned in a time of peace and prosperity for the Illyrian kingdom., ruled BC 260 ~ BC 250
 Agron of Illyria: reigned from 250 BC to 230 BC. In 231 BC, Agron possessed the most powerful land army and navy, of any of the kings who had reigned Illyria before him. He extended the kingdoms' borders in the north and south.
 Queen Teuta (regent for Pinnes): forced to come to terms with the Romans in 227 BC.
 Demetrius of Pharos: surrenders to the Romans at Pharos in 218 BC and flees to Macedonia., ruled B.C 222~B.C 219
 Scerdilaidas: allied with Rome to defeat Macedonia in 208 BC., ruled B.C 218~B.C 206
 Pinnes: too young to become king; ruled under the regency of Teuta, Demetrius and Scerdilaidas., ruled B.C 230~B.C 217
 Pleuratus III: rewarded by the Romans in 196 BC, with lands annexed by the Macedonians., ruled B.C 205~B.C 181
 Gentius: defeated by the Romans in 168 BC during the Third Illyrian War; Illyrian kingdom ceased to exist while the king was taken prisoner., ruled B.C 181~B.C 168
 Ballaios: Ruled from c. 167 BC to c. 135 BC over the city of Rhizon and surrounding areas after Roman occupation, until 135 BC.

Minor rulers 

Histria
 Epulon, ruler of Histria: thwarted Roman advances in the Istrian peninsula until his death in 177 BC.

Dalmatae
 Verzo, ruler of the Dalmatae: took the city of Promona from the Liburni in order to ambush Octavian in 34 BC.
 Testimos, ruler of the Dalmatae: defeated by the Romans in 33 BC; Dalmatia incorporated into Roman Republic.

Messapia
 Opis of Messapia: attacked by Taras in 460 BC at Hyria, in which he died.

Pannonia
 Pinnes of Pannonia: led Pannonians in the Great Illyrian Revolt from 6 AD.

See also 
 Illyria
 Illyrians
 Illyrology
 Queen Teuta
 Illyri proprie dicti
 Kingdom of Dardania

References

Notes

Citations

Bibliography

External links 

 Appian: Illyrian Wars, perseus.tufts
 Pliny the Elder. Natural History (Pliny) (Naturalis Historia (Latin)  and English version).
  (English version and Introduction).
  (English version).
 (English version).
 Velleius Paterculus: History of Rome (Latin original, English translation)  
Illyria